Palli or Pally may refer to:

People
Angeliki Palli (1798–1875), Greek-Italian writer, translator and early feminist
Anne Marie Palli (born 1955), French golfer
Fani Palli-Petralia (born 1943), Greek lawyer and politician
Niki Palli (born 1987), Israeli athlete

Places
Pälli, village in Lääne-Nigula Parish, Lääne County, Estonia
Palli, Hiiu County, village in Hiiumaa Parish, Hiiu County, Estonia
Palli, Võru County, village in Haanja Parish, Võru County, Estonia

Other uses
Palle, Palli or Pally, means village in Telugu
Palli, native word for a non-Hindu shrine in south India
Palli is a Most Backward Caste caste in Tamil Nadu

See also
Pali, a Middle Indo-Aryan language native to the Indian subcontinent
Pallis, a Greek surname
Palle (disambiguation)